Lo Mejor de Mí is the fifth studio album recorded by Mexican singer-songwriter Cristian Castro, credited for this recording simply as "Cristian." It was released by BMG U.S. Latin on September 30, 1997 (see 1997 in music). The first album from under record label. The album was produced by Rudy Pérez.

This album received nomination for Grammy Award for Best Latin Pop Album at the 40th Annual Grammy Awards, on February 25, 1998, losing to Romances by Luis Miguel. The title track was included in the 1998 compilation recording Billboard Latin Music Awards Superstar Hits and reached #1 on Hot Latin Tracks of 1997. The album also was nominated for Pop Recording of the Year at the 10th Lo Nuestro Awards.

Track listing

Charts

Sales and certifications

References

1997 albums
Cristian Castro albums
Spanish-language albums
Albums produced by Rudy Pérez
Bertelsmann Music Group albums